Made in the Streets may refer to:

Made in the Streets (charity), a Christian charitable and educational organization in Nairobi, Kenya
Made in the Streets (album), a 2013 album by Fredro Starr